The Copa do Brasil 2001 was the 13th staging of the Copa do Brasil. 

The competition started on March 14, 2001 and concluded on June 13, 2001 with the second leg of the final, held at the Estádio do Morumbi in São Paulo, in which Grêmio lifted the trophy for the fourth time with a 3-1 victory over Corinthians.

Washington, of Ponte Preta, with 12 goals, was the competition's topscorer.

Format
The competition was disputed by 64 clubs in a knock-out format where all rounds were played over two legs and the away goals rule was used, but in the first two rounds if the away team won the first leg with an advantage of at least two goals, the second leg was not played and the club automatically qualified to the next round.

Competition stages

References
 Copa do Brasil 2001 at RSSSF
 Copa do Brasil top scorers at Campeões do Futebol

2001 domestic association football cups
2001
2001 in Brazilian football